Henry Arlin Turner (November 25, 1909 – April 24, 1980) was an American biographer and professor of English, specializing in American literature of the 19th century.

Biography
Arlin Turner graduated from West Texas State Teachers College with bachelor's degree in 1927 and from the University of Texas with Ph.D. in 1934. From 1933 to 1936 he taught in the English department of the University of Texas. From 1936 to 1952 he was a member of the department of English at Louisiana State University. During WW II he served in the United States Naval Reserve.

Turner was from 1953 to 1979 a professor at Duke University, where he also chaired the department of English for sixteen years. He retired in 1979 from Duke University as professor emeritus and then from 1979 until his death in 1980 taught at Southwest Texas State University.

Turner wrote four books and more than seventy articles published in scholarly journals. He wrote extensively on Nathaniel Hawthorne, George Washington Cable, and Mark Twain. Turner was managing editor from 1954 to 1963 and then editor from 1963 to 1979 for American Literature (published by Duke University Press). He also served on the editorial boards of Resources for American Literary Study, the South Atlantic Quarterly, the Arlington Quarterly, Studies in American Humor, and the Southern Literary Journal.

Turner was awarded Guggenheim Fellowships for the academic years 1947–1948 and 1959–1960. In 1958 the Southern Historical Association gave him the Charles S. Sydnor Award for his 1956 biography of George W. Cable. Turner was awarded an honorary degree of Doctor of Literature in 1976 from Berea College. In 1980 a collection of literary essays was published in his honor. His wife was Thelma Sherrill Turner (1910?–1999).

Selected publications

Articles

Books

References

External links
 Guide to the Arlin Turner Papers, 1927–1980

1909 births
1980 deaths
American book editors
American literary critics
20th-century American biographers
20th-century American essayists
American male non-fiction writers
West Texas A&M University alumni
University of Texas alumni
Louisiana State University faculty
Duke University faculty
People from Abilene, Texas
20th-century American male writers